Zabar's is an appetizing store at 2245 Broadway and 80th Street, on the Upper West Side of Manhattan in New York City, founded by Louis Zabar and Lillian Zabar. It is known for its selection of bagels, smoked fish, olives, and cheeses.

History

Louis Zabar (1901–1950) came to the United States through Canada from Ukraine, Soviet Union, in the early 1920s. His father, also a merchant, had earlier been murdered in a pogrom in Ukraine. Louis first lived in Brooklyn, where he rented a stall in a farmer's market. He married Lillian Teitlebaum (1905–1995) on May 2, 1927, and they had three children: Saul Zabar (born in 1929), Stanley Zabar, and Eli Zabar. Lillian had come to America by herself and settled with relatives in Philadelphia. She moved to New York City and met Louis Zabar, whom she knew from their village in Ukraine. Louis Zabar died in 1950 and was then the owner of 10 markets. After the death of Louis, Lillian married Louis Chartoff (1900–1978). From 1960 to 1994, brothers Stanley and Saul Zabar partnered and co-owned Zabar's with Murray Klein, who joined the store in 1953, but was not a member of the Zabar family. Klein officially retired from the store in 1994 and died on December 6, 2007, in New York City.

Importing the Wigomat and other drip coffee makers in the late 1960s, Zabar's was the first shop selling these machines in the USA.  Zabar's is headed by Saul Zabar as the president and co-owner. He was attending the University of Kansas when his father died. Stanley Zabar is the vice president and a co-owner. He was a student at Horace Mann School and later the University of Pennsylvania the year his father died. Their brother Eli Zabar has his own line of specialty shops which includes the Vinegar Factory, on East 91st Street near York Avenue, and E.A.T., at Madison Avenue near 80th Street. A move and expansion in the 1970s made Zabar's one of the largest supermarkets in Manhattan.

In 2022, a book chronicling the history of Zabar's and its food was published: Zabar's: A Family Story With Recipes.  The author, Lori Zabar, who died of breast cancer in February 2022 at age 67, was the eldest grandchild of the founders, Louis and Lilly Zabar.

Lobster salad controversy
In 2011, Zabar's briefly got nationwide attention from news outlets when a reporter for New Orleans' Times-Picayune observed that the store's product labeled "Lobster Salad" actually contained no lobster. The New York Times reported that the store "charged $16.95 a pound" for the seafood spread made mostly of salted crawfish and mayonnaise. Maine's Bangor Daily News said a Maine Lobster Council director advised Saul Zabar
"of the federal regulations that make deliberate misbranding of food products a serious violation" and that the "Food and Drug Administration permits the use of the term lobster without qualification only for the Homarus species, which includes the European and American lobsters.... labeling other species...  as 'lobster' without qualification would cause the product to be misbranded in violation of the Food, Drug, and Cosmetic Act." The New York Times said "the lobsterless lobster salad" was sold at Zabar's for 15 years and that Saul Zabar insisted that he had not meant to deceive anyone.  A photo published in Gothamist showed that the product's deli-label ingredients list made no mention of lobster; the word lobster only appeared above the ingredients in the large print all caps product name, "LOBSTER SALAD   *WITH A BAGEL OR A ROLL*  ". After the media attention, Zabar's combined the product's name with the store name and relabeled the spread Zabster Zalad.

Cultural references
 The music video of Vampire Weekend's "Sunflower" was filmed in Zabar's.

See also

 List of Jewish delis

References

External links
 
 

1934 establishments in New York City
Appetizing stores
Companies based in Manhattan
Companies based in New York City
Jewish delicatessens in the United States
Jews and Judaism in Manhattan
Retail companies established in 1934
Supermarkets of the United States
Ukrainian-Jewish culture in New York City
Upper West Side